Styrrup is a village in the civil parish of Styrrup with Oldcotes on the B6463 road in the Bassetlaw district, in the English county of Nottinghamshire. The population of the civil parish at the 2011 census was 685. It is near the small town of Harworth. The village is surrounded by farmland and is approximately 1 mile from the A1 road intersection at Blyth. The housing consists primarily of modern properties constructed in the 1970s and numerous barn conversions arranged off the Main Street. The local pub, The White Swan, has been demolished and replaced by modern housing.

Etymology
In the Domesday survey it is mentioned as Estirapc - Eastern rape - as it lies on the borders east of the west riding of York.

References

 UK Villages Styrrup

Villages in Nottinghamshire
Bassetlaw District